Jos Huysmans (18 December 1941 – 10 October 2012) was a Belgian professional road bicycle racer.

Major results

 1963
 1st, Rummen
 1964
 1st, Bruxelles-Liège
 1st, Stage 5a, Four Days of Dunkirk
 1st, Stage 4a, Tour of Belgium
 1st, Machelen
 1965
 1st, Brugg
 1st, Bulle
 2nd, Overall, Tour de Suisse
 1st, Stage 1, Tour de Suisse
 1st, Tienen
 1st, Wetteren
 1966
 1st, Berlare
 1st, De Panne, Criterium
 1st, Heusden O-Vlaanderen
 1st, Kessel–Lier
 1st, Stage 1, Four Days of Dunkirk
 3rd,  National Road Championships
 1st, Itegem
 1967
 1st, Stage 2b, Tour of Belgium (Team time trial)
 1st, Ath
 1st, Koksijde
 8th, Overall, Tour de France
 1st, Ronse
 1st, Rijmenam
 1st, Heusden O-Vlaanderen
 1968
 1st, GP Briek Schotte
 1st, Kampioenschap van Vlaanderen
 1st, Mandel-Leie-Schelde
 1st, Nandrin
 1st, Berlaar
 1st, Tour du Condroz
Tour de France:
Winner stage 20
 1969
 1st, Stage 6a, Critérium du Dauphiné Libéré (FRA)
 1st, Schaal Sels
 1st, Stage 2b, Tour of Belgium (Team time trial)
 2nd, Amstel Gold Race
 1st, La Flèche Wallonne
 1st, Reims-Ivoz-Ramet
 1970
 1st, Rijmenam
 1st, Houtem
 1971
 1st, Berlaar
 1972
 1st, Onze-Lieve-Vrouw-Waver
 2nd, Paris–Tours
Tour de France:
Winner stage 9
 1973
 1st, Stadsprijs Geraardsbergen
 1st, Ulvenhout
 1st, Ronse
 1974
 1st, Kessel–Lier
 1975
 1st, Kampioenschap van Vlaanderen
 1976
 1st, Humbeek

References

External links 

Belgian male cyclists
1941 births
2012 deaths
Belgian Tour de France stage winners
Cyclists from Antwerp Province
People from Putte
Tour de Suisse stage winners
20th-century Belgian people